Tukhlya or Tukhlia is a village (selo) in Ukraine, in Stryi Raion of Lviv Oblast. It belongs to Slavske settlement hromada, one of the hromadas of Ukraine. The population was 1752 as of the 2001 census.

The village lies in the narrow valley of the river Opir. On the north-eastern outskirts of the village, the  stream flows into the Opir.

Etymology 
There are two proposed origins for the name of the village, although they may qualify as pseudo-etymologies. The first derives the toponym from a Slavic root meaning "foul-smelling" (cf. Russian , tuxlyj). According to one version, this name allegedly came about due to the stench of the corpses of vanquished Mongol-Tatar invaders.

The other story involves an old man who became exhausted in the course of traveling and decided to settle down in Tukhlya. Later, officials ask him the name of the village, and he responds by explaining that it had no name, he was just tired and decided to stay there. According to this story, the name would derive from the Ukrainian verb  (oxljanuty, "to be exhausted").

History 
In the second half of the 1880s, the Stryi–Mukachevo railway was laid through the village. The village has , with adjacent stops in Hrebeniv (to the north) and in Slavske (south), a famous ski resort. Due to the fact that it is convenient to get here (either from Lviv or Zakarpattia), ecotourism has developed in the village.

Tukhlya is closely connected with the life and work of Ivan Franko. The village became famous for being described by Franko in his novel . In Tukhlya there is a well dedicated to Ivan Franko, a monument to the writer, as well as a church painted by Kornylo Ustiyanovych. The mountainous area around the village is the site of historical events, which are described in Franko's novel. On a mountain in the southern outskirts of the village, behind the river Opir, there stands a statue of Zakhar Berkut—exactly where, according to folklore, the historical figure was buried. There is a stone in the village, said to be the one that blocked the mountain stream that drowned the Mongol-Tatar invaders. A commemorative inscription was carved on it. 

Ivan Franko's work relies on some historical facts, such as the names of the leaders of the Mongol-Tatars, and another source of writing the story was Carpathian folklore. The particular account of the sinking of the Mongols in the Carpathians is not known to history. The 2019 film The Rising Hawk was also made on the basis of the story.

Until 18 July 2020, Tukhlya belonged to Skole Raion. The raion was abolished in July 2020 as part of the administrative reform of Ukraine, which reduced the number of raions of Lviv Oblast to seven. The area of Skole Raion was merged into Stryi Raion.

Demographics 
According to the 1989 Soviet census, the population of the village was 1812 residents, of whom 907 were men and 905 were women.

At the time of the 2001 Ukrainian census, 1752 people lived in the village.

Language 
Population distribution by mother tongue according to the 2001 census:

Transportation 

Sites of interest 
The following locations are recognized heritage sites:
  — a well from which Ivan Franko allegedly drank

Mount Zakhar (or Putyshche) 
The official name of the mountain is Putyshche. The people left a statue on behalf of Zakhar Berkut on the summit, exactly where, according to legend, the historical figure is buried.

Notable people 

  (1962) — Ukrainian lawyer and politician.
  (1935—2002) — Ukrainian Soviet poet.
  (1942—2008) — poet.
  (1908—2009) — professor of music, public figure.
  (1973) — Ukrainian journalist and public figure.

References

External links 

 
Villages in Stryi Raion